The fourth season of Yu-Gi-Oh! Duel Monsters, created by Kazuki Takahashi, was broadcast in Japan on TV Tokyo from February 18 to December 17, 2003. In the United States, the season was broadcast under the subtitle Waking the Dragons, and aired from September 11, 2004 to May 28, 2005 on Kids' WB.

The season follows an original story arc in-which Dartz, using the magic of the Orichalcos stones, and his three servants – Alister, Rafael, and Valon — bring chaos to the world. Yugi, Joey, and Kaiba face off against the Orichalcos using three legendary dragon cards from the monster world.

The first 28 episodes of the season were released in three DVD volumes between December 2005 and April 2008 through Funimation. The season was fully released on DVD and digital format on March 25, 2014, through Cinedigm, after striking a deal with 4K Media Inc. The fourth season was formerly licensed by 4Kids Entertainment in North America and other English-speaking countries and territories, and was formerly distributed by FUNimation Productions, LTD. on Region 1 home video and also distributed by Warner Bros. Television Animation through US television rights, when it aired on Kids’ WB!, also in North America. It is now licensed and distributed by Konami Cross Media NY, Inc.

Cast and characters

Japanese

Regular
 Hidehiro Kikuchi as Hiroto Honda
 Hiroki Takahashi as Katsuya Jonouchi
 Kenjiro Tsuda as Seto Kaiba
 Maki Saitoh as Anzu Mazaki
 Shunsuke Kazama as Yugi Moto/Yami Yugi

Recurring
 Yukishige Iemura as Amelda
 Yuu Emaou as Dartz
 Ryou Naito as Ryuji Otogi
 Saburo Kodaka as Arthur Hopkins
 Kaori Tagami as Rebecca Hopkins
 Yusaku Yara as Ironheart
 Junkoh Takeuchi as Mokuba Kaiba
 Chieko Higuchi as Kuriso (Kris)

 Tadashi Miyazawa as Sugoroku Mutou
 Jiro Takasugi as Pegasus J. Crawford
 Yoshihisa Kawahara as Raphael
 Yuuichi Nakamura as Dinosaur Ryuzaki
 Urara Takano as Insector Haga
 Haruhi Terada as Mai Kujaku
 Takeshi as Varon

English

Regular
 Amy Birnbaum as Téa Gardner
 John Campbell as Tristan Taylor
 Wayne Grayson as Joey Wheeler
 Dan Green as Yugi Muto/Yami Yugi
 Eric Stuart as Seto Kaiba

Recurring
 Ted Lewis as Alister
 Wayne Grayson as Dartz
 Marc Thompson as Duke Devlin, Rafael, and Valon
 Mike Pollock as Arthur Hawkins and Gurimo
 Kerry Williams as Rebecca Hawkins
 Brian Maillard as Ironheart
 Veronica Taylor as Chris
 Tara Jayne as Mokuba Kaiba
 Maddie Blaustein as Solomon Muto
 Darren Dunstan as Maximillion Pegasus
 Anthony Salerno as Rex Raptor
 Jimmy Zoppi as Weevil Underwood
 Bella Hudson as Mai Valentine

Home media
Between December 2005 and April 2008, Funimation Productions released the first 28 episodes of the season over three volumes of DVDs, each containing 7-9 episodes. In late 2013, Cinedigm and 4K Media Inc. reached a distribution agreement that would result in the release of every episode from the Yu-Gi-Oh! franchise on DVD and Blu-ray and to digital retailers. The complete fourth season, titled Yu-Gi-Oh! Classic: Season 4, was released on March 25, 2014, on DVD. It was also released in two volumes, like the previous seasons, on the same day both digitally and on DVD.

Episode list

DVD release

References

General

Specific

2003 Japanese television seasons
Duel Monsters (season 4)